The Turtle Mountain Times is a weekly local newspaper based in Belcourt, North Dakota. It is published in print edition only, and in English. It was established by the Turtle Mountain Band of Chippewa Indians and the first edition was published in June 1993. The paper was founded by Richard J. “Jiggers” LaFramboise, at the time the chairman of the Turtle Mountain Band of Chippewa, with assistance from the then owner of Indian Country Today. The first staff worked for a short time at Indian Country Today as part of their training for setting up the newspaper. The establishment of the newspaper was seen as a positive move in shaping the Native American media narrative.

The first editor of the newspaper was Robin Poitra-Powell. Despite early assurance of non-interference, Poitra-Powell was fired in 1994 by the tribal council after a disagreement about publishing the minutes of tribal council meetings.

The current editor of the newspaper is the Turtle Mountain Band of Chippewa.

References 

North Dakota culture
Newspapers published in North Dakota
Native American newspapers